John Brown (22 March 1820 – date of death unknown) was an English cricketer.  Brown's batting and bowling styles are unknown. He was born at Warblington, Hampshire.

Brown represented Hampshire in a single first-class match in 1849 against an All-England Eleven. In this match he scored a single run in the Hampshire first-innings, before being dismissed by William Hillyer. In Hampshire's second-innings he scored 8 runs, before being dismissed by the same bowler.

His father, George, also played first-class cricket for Hampshire and Sussex. His brother, George, played first-class cricket for Sussex. Brown's date and place of death are unknown.

References

External links
John Brown at ESPNcricinfo
John Brown at CricketArchive

1820 births
People from Havant
English cricketers
Hampshire cricketers
Year of death missing
People from Warblington